Li Kui is a fictional character in Water Margin, one of the Four Great Classical Novels in Chinese literature. Nicknamed "Black Whirlwind", he ranks 22nd among the 36 Heavenly Spirits.

Background
The novel depicts Li Kui as having a very dark complexion, a reddish-yellow unibrow and fiery-looking eyes. He is as strong as an ox, which is why he is called "Iron Ox". But he is better known as "Black Whirlwind" for his dark skin and his berserk behaviour in fights. Li, who carries a pair of axes, has a bad temper, likes to drink and is fond of gambling. He strikes fear in people just with an intense glare. 

A native of Baizhang Village in Yishui County (in present-day Linyi, Shandong), Li Kui flees from home after killing a person by accident. He ends up in Jiangzhou (江州; present-day Jiujiang, Jiangxi), where he becomes a jailer under the chief warden Dai Zong. He gets to know Song Jiang, who was exiled from Yuncheng for killing his mistress Yan Poxi. Li Kui draws the attention of Song, who was dining with Dai in an inn, when he threatens the keeper of the inn to lend him money. Song and Li take to each other as one appreciates utmost forthrightness and the other unstinting generosity. As they are having a meal, Song Jiang suddenly craves for fish. As the fish at the restaurant is not fresh, Li Kui volunteers to get some from the riverside market. Impatient to wait for the chief fishmonger Zhang Shun to come, he tries to snatch some fish from their cages but inadvertently releases them into the river. Zhang arrives and fights Li Kui. Li Kui beats Zhang Shun easily, but the fishmonger lures him onto a boat, which he then overturns, causing Li Kui to fall into the water. Li, a non-swimmer, is continuously dragged down under water by Zhang. Luckily, Song Jiang and Dai Zong come to the scene and stop the fight. The four become friends.

Joining Liangshan

Song Jiang, who could travel in and out of jail freely due to Dai Zong, is arrested after he wrote a seditious poem on the wall of a restaurant after getting drunk. Dai, in conspiracy with the Liangshan outlaws, tries to trick Cai Jiu, the prefect of Jiangzhou, to send Song to the imperial capital Dongjing, hoping to rescue him midway. The plan is found out and Dai is arrested too and sentenced to death with Song.

Just when the two are about to be beheaded in public, Li Kui leaps down from a rooftop and hacks the executioners to death. The Liangshan chieftains who have surrounded the execution ground join the fight against the soldiers. They then flee the scene following Li Kui, who goes on a bloody rampage hacking every one who gets in his way. Chao Gai, the chief of Liangshan, manages to stop his indiscriminate killing. They are then stranded at a riverside temple wondering how to cross the waters. When a government force comes and besieges the temple, Li Kui charges out first to drive them away, followed by the others. Zhang Shun and other friends of Song Jiang from the Jieyang region arrive with boats on their way to rescue Song. Huang Wenbing, the minor official who reported Song's seditious poem to the authorities, is captured by the Liangshan men and subjected to dismemberment by Li Kui. Li follows the group to Liangshan, where he becomes a chieftain.

Fetching his mother and slaying four tigers
Li Kui leaves Liangshan for his hometown to fetch his mother. He runs into Li Gui, who impersonates him to rob lone travelers on a remote pathway. Li Kui beats Li Gui and wants to kill him for smearing his name. But when Li Gui lies that he has an aged mother to feed, Li Kui spares him and gives him some money to boot. Shortly afterwards, Li Kui comes to rest at Li Gui's house and overhears Li Gui discussing with his wife how to capture him and turn him in for a reward. Infuriated, Li Kui kills Li Gui but the wife gets away.

Reaching home, Li Kui meets his elder brother Li Da, who, afraid of being implicated, rushes off to get men to arrest him. Li Kui flees with his mother, who has gone blind, carrying her on his back. They come to a hill, where his mother complains of thirst. So Li Kui goes off to search for water. When he returns, he is shocked to discover that his mother has been eaten up by tigers. Overwhelmed with grief, he follows the trail of his mother's blood to the lair, where he slays all the four tigers, two of which are cubs. He becomes famous in the local town for getting rid of the man-eaters.

The local rich man Squire Cao pretends to shower Li Kui with gifts. In fact, he has learnt from Li Gui's wife the identity of the tiger slayer. Li Kui is drugged and tied up. Constable Li Yun is sent from the county office with some guards to pick him up. Before they head back to the county, Liangshan's Zhu Gui (who has been sent by Song Jiang to keep tabs on Li Kui) and his brother Zhu Fu, an innkeeper and martial arts student of Li Yun, pretend to offer them refreshments. The guards are knocked out by the spiked drinks. Li Kui kills them but spares Li Yun in deference to Zhu Fu's plea. When Li Yun comes to, he sees he has no choice but to join Liangshan too.

A number of heroes join Liangshan due to Li Kui. One of them is Zhu Tong, who finds himself incriminated after the young boy of a magistrate placed in his care is killed by Li Kui on a night when he took the kid outdoors. The killing was in fact ordered by Wu Yong, Liangshan's chief strategist, to force Zhu to join the stronghold. Li Kui is barred from going back to Liangshan as insisted by Zhu. He is left to stay in the residence of the nobleman Chai Jin. Then Chai is called to Gaotangzhou by his uncle's family as Yin Tianxi, a relative of the local prefect Gao Lian, wants to seize their mansion. Angry at the bullying, Li Kui beats Yin to death, resulting in the arrest of Chai Jin by Gao Lian. Li Kui flees back to Liangshan to report the incident.

As Gao Lian is an expert in sorcery, Song Jiang sends Dai Zong and Li Kui to fetch Liangshan's magician Gongsun Sheng to fight him. Gongsun has not returned to the stronghold since leaving to visit his mother in Jizhou. Gongsun's teacher Taoist Luo refuses to let him go. So Li Kui steals into Luo's sanctum after nightfall and hacks off his head. He is surprised to find Luo alive the next day. Luo punishes Li Kui by sweeping him off to a magistrate office with a squall. He is locked up there as he is believed to be a demon from the sky. Luo finally takes him back and allows Gongsun to leave with them. After defeating Gao Lian, the outlaws find Chai Jin hidden in a dry well by a jailer to protect him from Gao Lian. Li Kui volunteers to go down the dark deep well to take Chai up.

Campaigns and death

Li Kui is appointed as one of the leaders of the Liangshan infantry after the 108 Stars of Destiny came together in what is called the Grand Assembly.

Li Kui is against Song Jiang's quest for amnesty from Emperor Huizong, seeing it as capitulation to the imperial court. He sabotages Song Jiang's meeting in Dongjing with Li Shishi, a courtesan whom the emperor secretly patronises. Song has hoped the woman could move the monarch to pardon Liangshan. When the first edict of amnesty arrives at Liangshan, Li Kui tears it up before it is read out to the outlaws. After government forces suffered defeats at the hands of Liangshan, the emperor decides to grant them amnesty again. This time Li Kui could do nothing.

Li Kui is one of the few Liangshan heroes who survive the campaigns against the Liao invaders and rebel forces on Song territory. He is appointed an official in Runzhou (潤州; present-day Runzhou District, Zhenjiang, Jiangsu) for his contributions. Missing his carefree life on Liangshan, Li Kui shows no interest in the job and spends most of his time drinking.

When Song Jiang realises that he has been poisoned by corrupt officials of the court, he is worried that Li Kui might stir up trouble and besmear the name of Liangshan. He summons Li to his office in Chuzhou (楚州; present-day Huai'an, Jiangsu) and offers him the same poisoned wine. Upon learning what he has drunk, Li Kui embraces his fate and requests to be buried next to Song Jiang. He dies after returning to Runzhou. Li Kui appears in Emperor Huizong's dream in the novel's last chapter, charging at the monarch with his axes in an attempt to avenge their wrongful deaths.

Other cultural depictions of Li Kui

In the video game Jade Empire by Bioware, a character who resembles Li Kui and also goes by the nickname "The Black Whirlwind" joins the player's party as it gets underway. He displays many of the same traits as the Water Margin character and wields the same fighting weapon (twin axes).

The OVA adaptation of Mitsuteru Yokoyama's Giant Robo could not obtain licence for the original cast of the manga or the live-action series, so the creators used characters from Yokoyama's body of work, including adaptations of Water Margin. The character of Tetsugyu (which roughly translates as "Iron Ox"), known too as the Black Whirlwind, is based on Yokoyama's adaptation of Li Kui.

See also
 List of Water Margin minor characters#Li Kui's story for a list of supporting minor characters from Li Kui's story.

References
 
 
 
 
 
 
 

36 Heavenly Spirits
Fictional mass murderers
Fictional serial killers
Fictional prison officers and governors
Fictional gamblers
Fictional characters from Shandong